The Centre for Cellular and Molecular Platforms (C-CAMP) is an initiative of the Department of Biotechnology, Ministry of Science, Technology and Earth Sciences, Govt. of India. Established in 2009 with a mandate to enable cutting edge Life Sciences Research and Innovation, C-CAMP is the country’s most exciting life sciences innovation hub bringing together academia, industry and the startup ecosystem - all on one platform. It is also a part of the one of the country’s earliest bio-clusters, the Bangalore Bio-Cluster.

Vision
C-CAMP is envisioned to be an enabler for cutting-edge Bioscience research and innovation through its two major arms: services in state-of-the-art platform technologies and facilitation of Life Sciences innovation and entrepreneurship. It acts as the provider and developer of high-end technologies in life sciences to enable scientific activity and entrepreneurship. C-CAMP allows investigators to use techniques as tools and not be limited by technological barriers while pursuing challenging scientific questions. 250+ institutes and organisations from all across India have accessed its technology platforms. Altogether C-CAMP supported publications now number 100+. 
 
From lab-space and high-end technical resources, to active involvement in Seed Funding schemes, scientific and business Mentorship and Accelerator programs, it provides a comprehensive, all-round support system to bio entrepreneurs with exciting deep-science ideas.
 
C-CAMP has directly funded, incubated and mentored over 100 start-ups over the last few years and is connected to about 500 startups and entrepreneurs across the country.

Technologies and services
C-CAMP is mandated to provide high-end platform technologies and expertise to all the academic and industrial scientific researchers in and around India. Some functions provided by its facilities include:
 Confocal and fluorescence microscopy
 Flow cytometry
 Mass Spectrometry and Biomolecular characterization through proteomics, lipidomics, glycomics, metabolomics
 Genomic sequencing and bioinformatics
 Protein technology core
 High-throughput screening and High-content screening
 A transgenic fly facility
 A Microfluidics and microfabrication facility
 Mouse genome editing 
 Nuclear magnetic resonance spectroscopy 
 Electron microscope
 NBM funded Medtech Rapid prototyping facility for microfluidic diagnostic devices

Innovation and entrepreneurship
As a part of C-CAMP’s core mandate to nurture entrepreneurs in Biosciences across the country, it supports and handholds innovators on their journey to translate a bench-level idea into a full-fledged profit-making business venture. The support facilities C-CAMP provides are:
 Seed Funding Schemes 
 Incubation facilities 
 Mentorship Program 
 C-CAMP Startup Advancement Program (C-SAP) 
 C-CAMP Agri Innovation Centre 
 An Intellectual Property Management Office and a Technology Transfer Office
 An Innovation Accelerator: Discovery to Innovation Accelerator 
 BIRAC Regional Entrepreneurship Centre, BREC set up at C-CAMP in 2017 with the objective of amplifying bio entrepreneurship across the country.

Awards
C-CAMP has received the National Entrepreneurship Award 2017 from the Ministry of Skill Development and Entrepreneurship MSDE, Govt of India.

References

External links 
Official website

Biotechnology organizations
Biotechnology companies of India
Companies based in Bangalore
Public–private partnership
2009 establishments in Karnataka
Research institutes established in 2009
Business incubators of India